Silvio Fernández may refer to:

 Silvio Fernández (fencer born 1946), Venezuelan fencer who competed at the 1968 Summer Olympics
 Silvio Fernández (footballer) (born 1974), Uruguayan footballer
 Silvio Fernández (fencer born 1979), Venezuelan fencer who competed at the 2004 and 2008 Summer Olympics